The title of Chancellor or Vice-Chancellor is used by many academic institutions:

Lists of chancellors

Chancellor of the College of William & Mary
List of chancellors of Durham University
Queen's University, Belfast
University of Cambridge
University of London
University of Massachusetts Amherst
University of Oxford

Lists of chancellors, vice-chancellors and presidents

List of chancellors, vice-chancellors and presidents of the Royal Melbourne Institute of Technology

Lists of chancellors and vice-chancellors
British universities
South African universities
University of Pretoria

Lists of vice-chancellors
List of vice-chancellors of Bangladeshi universities
Aligarh Muslim University
Banaras Hindu University
Durham University
Indira Gandhi National Open University
John Moores University
Nigerian universities
Queen's University, Belfast
University of Auckland
University of Cambridge
University of Cape Town
University of Hertfordshire
University of Hong Kong
University of London
University of Malaya
University of Oxford
University of Wales, Trinity Saint David

See also

Austria
Germany
List of chancellors of Transylvania

Lists of education lists